The Districts of Zimbabwe are divided into 1,200 municipal wards. The wards are listed below, by district: Kenilworth is under Bubi district  There is a high school Mangubeni high Where Pretty Ndlovu the last daughter of war veteran Mack Mackie Ndlovu. It's a Resettlement from 1990

Beitbridge District

Beitbridge
Chipise
Dendele
Dite II

Machuchuta
Maramani
 Masera
Mtetengwe I

Mtetengwe II
Mtetengwe III
Siyoka I
Siyoka II

Unincorporated Area

Bikita District

Baradzanwa
Bikita
Boora
Chigumisirwa
Chikuku
Chikukutu
Chiremwaremwa
Chirorwe
Devure

Devure Ranch
Gangare
Magocha
Marozva (a)
Marozva (b)
Mashoko
Matsvange
Mazungunye
Mukore

Mungezi
Mupamaonde
Murwira
Museti
Mutikizizi
Negovano
Nyahunda
Nyarushiri
Unincorporated Area

Bindura District

Chiveso
Dindinyongwe
Gudza
Guwa

Mhumhurwi
Muchapondwa
Muonwe
Mupandira

Mutowa
Nyava
Unincorporated Area

Binga District

Chete National Park
Chinonge
Chunga
Dobola
Kabuba
Kariangwe
Kalungwizi
Lubimbi
Lubu
Lunga

Manjolo
Muchesu
Nabusenga
National Park
Nsenga
Pashu
Saba-lubanda
Siachilaba

Sianzyundu
Sikalenge
Simatelele
Sinamagonde
Sinampande-Nagangala
Sinansengwe
Tinde
Unincorporated Area

Bubi District
Inyathi
Nkosikazi East
Nkosikazi North
Nkosikazi South
Unincorporated

Buhera District

Betera
Chapwanya
Chikuwa
Chimombe 'b (Chimombe-chiweshe)
Chimombe A
Chimombe B
Chimombe East
Chimombe West
Chimombe West (Chimutsa W)
Chimutsa East
Chirozva A
Chirozva B

Chitsunge
Chiweshe
Garamwera
Mabvuregudo
Makumbe
Makuvise
Marume
Mawire
Mombeyarara A
Mombeyarara B
Mudinzwa A
Mudinzwa B

Mudzamiri
Munyira
Murambinda
Murwira
Mushumba East
Mushumba West
Mutiusinazita
Nechavava
Nerutanga
Neshava

Bulawayo District
Unincorporated

Bulilimamangwe District

Bambadzi
Bango
Dombodema
Dombolefu
Empandeni
Figtree
Gala
Gwambe
Hingwe
Huwana
Izimnyama

Mabhuna
Madlambuzi
Magcobafuthi
Makhulela
Malanswazi
Mambale
Maninji
Marula
Masendu
Matjingwe

Mphoengs
Natane
Ndolwane
Nyele
Raditladi
Sangulube
Sansukwe
Somnene
Tjankwa
Vulindlela
Unincorporated Area

Chegutu District

Chivero C (n)
Chivero M
Chivero M (l)
Chivero O
Gora
Mashayamombe (i)

Mashayamombe K
Mashayamombe P (j)
Murombedzi (h)
Ngezi C
Ngezi D
Nherera A

Nherera B
Nyamweda (q)
Nyamweda P
Rwizi F
Unincorporated Area
Ward 22 (Murombedzi H)

Chikomba District
Unincorporated Area

Chimanimani District

Biriri
Bumha (shinja Rs)
Chabika
Chakowa
Changazi
Chayamiti
Chikukwa

Chikwakwa
Chiramba
Guune
Kudzanga
Manyuseni
Mhakwe
Mhandarume

Ngorima A
Ngorima B
Nyahonde (nagodi Rs)
Nyanyadzi
Rupise
 Shinja
Unincorporated Area

Chipinge District

Ada Chisumbanje
Ada Middle Sabi
Bangwe/maunganidze
Checheche
Chibunji
Chibuwe
Chikore
Chinyaduma
Chipinge Urban
Chisumbanje
Chisungo
Chitenderano
Chitepo
Doroi
Dumisani

Gumira
Hondoyapera
Jersey
Machona
Madhuku
Mahenye
Manzvire
Maongere
Mapungwana
Masonga
Mbuyanehanda
Musani
Mushandirapamwe
Musirizwi A
Musirizwi B

Mutandahwe
Muzite
Ngaone
Nyagadza I
Nyagadza Ii
Nyamukunga
Nyaringire
Rudo
Small Dell Estate
Tamandayi
Tongogara Refugee Camp
Turaizvombo
Tuzuka
Unincorporated Area

Chiredzi District

Batanai
Chechingwe
Chibavahlengwe
Chibwedziva
Chikombedzi
Chitsa
Chizvirizvi
Dikitiki

Dzidzela
Gonakudzingwa
Gonarezhou
Makambe
Maose
Mkwasine
Mukuwini
Mupinga

Nyangambe
Sabi Valley Ica
Sengwe
Tshovani
Twananani
Unincorporated Area
Xini

Chirumhanzu District

Charandura
Chengwena
Chinyuni
Chizhou

Mapiravana
Maware
Mhende
Musoropamwe

Takawira
Takawira Resett
Tatonga
Tokwe (tokwe Iv) Rs

Unincorporated Area

Chivi District

Bachi
Badza\tiritose
Batanai
Batanai B
Bhefurai
Chasiyatende
Chemuzangari
Chigwikwi
Chitenderano
Kuvhirimara

Madamombe
Madzivadondo
Manyanga
Marihuru
Matsveru
Mazihuru
Mukamba
Munaka
Neruvanga
Ngundu

Nhamoyapera
Nyahombe
Rusununguko
Takawira
Unincorporated Area
Utsinda
Zifunzi
Zvamapere

Gokwe North District

Chireya I
Chireya Ii
Chireya Iii
Goredema
Gumunyu I
Gumunyu Ii
Madzivazvido

Makore I
Makore Ii
Musadzi Rs
Nembudziya I
Nembudziya Ii
Nembudziya Iii
Nenyunga

Nora Rs
Nyaurungwe Rs
Simchembo I
Simchembo Ii
Tsungai Rs
Unincorporated Area
Wadze Rs

Gokwe South District

Chemagora Lscfa
Chirima
Chirisa Park
Chisina I
Chisina Ii
Chisina Iii
Huchu
Jahana
Jiri

Masuka
Mukoka Msala
Muyambi
Ndhlalambi I
Ndhlalambi Ii
Nemangwe I
Nemangwe Ii
Nemangwe Iii
Nemangwe Iv

Nemangwe V
Ngomeni
Njelele I
Njelele Ii
Njelele Iii
Sai Mangidi
Sai Mangisi
Sai Sengwa
Unincorporated Area

Goromonzi District

Chinyika
Dzvete
Gutu
Mawanga

Munyawiri
Murape
Mwanza
Pote

R' NineShangure
Rusike
Shumba
Unincorporated Area

Guruve District

Bepura I
Bepura Ii
Bepura Iii
Chapoto
Chipuriro A
Chipuriro B
Chipuriro C

Chiriwo
Chisunga
Chitsungo
Knyurira
Mamini
Matsiwo A
Matsiwo B

Mukwenya
Mutota
Neshangwe
Nyamhondoro
Shayavhudzi
Suoguru
Unincorporated Area

Gutu District

Basera
Chigombe
Chihambakwe
Chikwanda\mazare
Chimedza
Chinyika
Chitsa
Chiwara
Chuguhune/denhere
Devure
Gutu South
Jinjika
Kubiku

Magombedze
Majada
Makore
Makudo
Makuvaza
Mataruse
Matizha
Mawere\Maungwa
Mazuru West
Mukaro
Munjanganja\Mupata
Munyaradzi\dzivarimwe
Munyikwa

Mupandawana
Mushayavanhu
Mutema
Mutero\nyamande
Ndahwi
Nerupiri
Nyamande
Nyazvidzi Sscfa
Serima\mavotsa
Soti Source
Unincorporated Area
Vhunjere
Zoma

Zvavahera/dandavare

Gwanda District

Halisupi
Buvuma
Sengezane
Mtshabezi Mission
Garanyemba
Gungwe
Nhwali

Kafusi
Lushongwe
Manama
Matshetshe
Mtshazo
Mzimuni
Nkwidze

Ntalale
Shake
Silonga
Simbumbumbu
Sizeze
Unincorporated Area

Gweru District

Bafana
Gambiza
Ilithelezwe
Madikani
Masvori Rs

Mdubiwa
Mlezu
Mutengwa
Nkawana
Nyabango

Nyama
Sikombingo
Somabhula
Unincorporated Area

Harare District
Unincorporated Area

Hurungwe District

Chemusimbe
Chiroti/fuleche
Chundu
Dandahwa
Kanyati
Kapfunde
Kapiri
Karereshi
Karoi

Karuru
Kazangarare
Makuti & Charara
Masanga
Matau
Mudzimu
Muzilawembe, (Mukakatanwa)
Nyama
Nyamhunga

Piriviri
Pote I
Pote II
Pote III
Ward 5 (Chisape)
Ward 6 (Maumbe)
Ward 7 (Chanetsa)
Unincorporated Areas: Mana Pools National Park, Chewore Safaria Area, Hurungwe Safari Area, Sapi Safari Area

Hwange District

Chidobe
Chikandakubi
Dete
Jambezi
Kachecheti

Lupote
Mabale
Makwandara
Mbizha
Nekabandama

Nekatambe
Nemananga
Sidinda
Silewu
Simangani
Change

Unincorporated Area

Hwedza District
Unincorporated Area

Insiza District

Avoca
Bekezela
Gwatemba
Mahole

Mashoko
Masiyephambili
Mbondweni
Ntunteni

Sanele
Sidzibe
Silalabuhwa
Unincorporated Area

Vokola

Kadoma District

Chegutu 6 Rs
Chenjiri S Scale
Hartley Safari
Jondale/bumbe

Jopani Rs
Manyoni Estate
Muzvezve I Rs
Muzvezve Ii Rs

Ngezi National Parks
Sachuru Rs
Unincorporated Area

Kariba District

Bumi Hills
Chalala
Charara Safaris
Gatshegatshe
Hurungwe Safaris B

Kanyati A
Kanyati B
Matusadonha Safaris
Mola A
Mola B

Musambakaruma A
Musambakaruma B
Negande B
Negande A
Unincorporated Area

Kwekwe District

Batanai
Chaminuka Ii
Chitepo
Empress Mine
Gwesela West
Inhlangano
Kubatana
Kushinga
Kwayedza

Mabura
Makaba
Msokeli
Mtshikitsha
Nhlanganisa
Ntabeni North
Ntabeni South
Sebenzani
Sesombi I

Sesombi I Rs
Sesombi Ii Rs
Sesombi Iii
Sesombi Iii Rs
Sidakeni
Silobela
Tongogara
Unincorporated Area
Zhombe Central

Lupane District

Daluka
Dandanda
Dongamuzi
Gomoza
Gwamba
Jibajiba
Jotsholo
Lake Alice

Lupaka
Lupanda (22)
Lusulu
Malunku
Matshiya
Matshokotsha
Menyezwa
Mzola (4)
Mzola (27)

Ndimimbili
Pupu
Sibombo
Sobendle
St Pauls
Tshongokwe
Kana
Gwayi
Mbembesi
Lupanda (28)
Unincorporated Area

Makonde District

Chitomborwizi
Doma
Magonde

Matashu
Unincorporated Area
Ward 17 (Tategura Rs)

Ward 3
Ward 4
Ward 5

Makoni District

Batanai
Bembero
Chiduku
Chinyamahumba
Chitangazuva
Denzva
Dowa
Dumbamwe
Gweza
Gwidza

Mashayamvura
Matotwe
Mhezi
Mutombwa
Mutungagore
Nehanda
Ngowe
Nyahangare
Nyahonwe
Nyamagura

Nyamatanda
Nyamidzi
Pasipanodya
Rongwe
Ruombwe
Sangano
Tikwiri
Tsagura
Unincorporated Area
Zurura

Marondera District
Unincorporated Area

Masvingo District

Charumbira (a)
Charumbira (b)
Charumbira (c)
Chatikobo
Chikwanda
Dowa
Gozho
Guwa
Inyoni Rs
Machitenda
Mapanzure
Maregere
Marirangwe

Mhara
Mshagashe East
Mshagashe West
Mugabe
Mukosi Rs
Munyambe
Murinye (a)
Murinye (b)
Mushandike
Mushavhi
Mushawasha East Sscfa
Mushawasha West Sscfa
Musingarambwi

Mutonhodza
Ngomahuru Sscfa
Nyajena
Nyajena
Nyamande
Nyikavanhu
Shumba
Summerton Rs
Tokwane\ngundu Rs
Unincorporated Area
Zimuto
Zvinyaningwe East Sscfa
Zvinyaningwe West Sscfa

Matobo District

Bambanani
Beula
Bidi
Dema
Donkwedonkwe
Dzembe
Gwezha
Lingwe

Madwaleni
Makhasa
Malaba
Manyane
Marinoha
Makwe
Mbembeswana
Mbuso

Mkokha
Nqindi
Sigangatsha
Silebuhwa
Sontala
St Anna
Unincorporated Area
Vulindlela
Zamanyoni
Lukadzi

Mazowe District

Chaminuka
Chipiri
Chiwororo
Endaikwenyu
Gato

Makombwe
Masiyazvengo
Nehanda
Nyadzonya
Nyota

Sawi
Tafirenyika
Takawira
Unincorporated Area

Mberengwa District

(New Castle) Rs
Baradzamwa
Bhangwe
Bhinya Road
Chebvute
Chegato
Cheshanga
Chingechuru
Chingoma A
Chingoma B
Chizungu

Danga
Dunda
Lscfa (mberengwa Ica)
Magamba
Mahlebadza
Makuwerere
Masvingo
Mataga
Mataruse B I
Mataruse B Ii
Maziofa

Mketi
Muchembere
Murerezi
Mushandirapamwe
Musume
Ngungumbane
Nyamondo Ii
Nyamondo Iii
Ruremekedzo
Vukomba
Zvomukonde

Mudzi District

Bangauya
Chikwizo A
Chikwizo B
Chimukoko
Goronga A
Goronga B

Makaha A
Makaha B
Masarakufa
Mukota A
Mukota B
Mukota C

Nyakuchena
Nyamukoho
Nyatana Game Park
Shinga  (Shanga)
Suswe

Mount Darwin District

Bveke
Chahwanda
Chesa Danzva
Chesa Mtondwe
Chesa North
Chesa Nyajenje
Chesa South
Chiswiti

Chitse
Dotito
Gomo Chigango
Kaitano
Kandeya
Karanda
Karuyana North
Karuyana South

Matope
Mudzengerere
Mukumbura
Nembire
Nohwedza
Pachanza
Sohwe
Unincorporated Area

Murehwa District

Chigonda
Chigwarada
Chikwira
Chipiri
Chitowa North
Chitowa South
Chiunze I
Chiunze Ii
Domborembudzi

Karamba
Mabika
Manyika
Maramba
Marowe
Masiyandima
Mawanza Chitsungo
Muchinjike
Mukarakate
Mukuruanopamaenza

Musami
Nhakiwa I
Nhakiwa Ii
Nyamhara
Rota
Rukudzi
Unincorporated Area
Zhombwe

Mutare District

Buwerimwe
Bvumba L.s.c.f.a
Chiadzwa
Chimoio
Chindunduma
Chishakwe I
Chishakwe Ii
Chitora
Dora North
Dora South
Dzobo
Gandayi

Gombakomba
Kugarisana
Kushingirira
Mafararikwa A
Mafararikwa B
Mudzimundiringe
Mukuni S.s.c.f.a
Mukwada
Munyoro
Mupudzi I
Mupudzi Ii
Muradzikwa

Murare
Mutanda I
Mutanda Ii
Mutsago
Mutupo
Ngomasha
Nhamburiko
Nyachityu
Nyahundi
Nyamazura Rs
Rowa
Unincorporated Area

Zimunya

Mutasa District

Chandisinai
Chikomba A
Chikomba B
Doweguru
Gondecharodzo
Mandeya A
Mandeya B
Mudwaramaredza

Mudzindiko
Muparutsa
Nyakujara
Nyamaende
Nyamhuka
Rutungagore
Sadziwa
Sahumani

Samanga A
Samanga B
Samaringa
Sanyahwe East
Sanyahwe West
Unincorporated Area
Zindi

Mutoko District

Charehwa A
Charehwa B
Chimoyo A
Chimoyo B
Chimoyo C
Chindenga
Chiwore
Gumbure
Kabasa A

Kabasa B
Kawere
Marira
Matedza
Mawanga
Mbudzi A
Mbudzi B
Mutoko Centre
Nyahondo

Nyahunure
Nyamhanza A
Nyamhanza B
Nyamuganhu
Nyamukapa
Nyamutsahuni
Nyamuzizi
Unincorporated Area

Muzarabani District

Chadereka
Chawarura
Chiweshe

Gutsa
Hoya
Hwatsa

Kapembere
Machaya
Muzarabani

Unincorporated Area

Mwenezi District

Bangwe
Basikiti
Chingami
Chirarange
Chirindi
Chitanga
Chizumba
Dinhe
Firidzi

Mabhare
Machena
Makawire
Makwi
Mangwerume
Manhumamwe
Marimuka
Marinda
Musaverema

Mushava
Negari
Nhande
Pambe
Rata
Shazhaume
Unincorporated Area
Wedza Block B

Nkayi District

Fanisoni
Faroni
Gwampa Forestry
Jojo East
Jojo South
Jojo West
Kenilworth
Malandu East
Malandu West

Malindi
Manguni I
Manguni Ii
Manomano
Mlume I
Mlume Ii
Mpande
Ngomambi Central
Ngomambi North

Ngomambi South
Nhlanganiso
Nkalakatha
Phillip
Sibangalwana Ii
Sibangelana I
Sikhobokhobo
Siphunyuka
Sivalo

Nyanga District

Sabvure
Bende
Chitsanza
Gairezi Rs
Gonde
Guramatunhu
Marawo
Mutombwa
Nyabunje
Nyadowa
Nyagota

Nyajezi
Nyakomba
Nyamahumba
KuNYamaropa
Nyamasara
Nyamubarawanda
Nyamutowera
Nyanga South
Nyanga South Rs
Nyanga Town

Nyautare
Ruwangwe
Rwenya Game Park
Sanhani/shungu/kuedza
Sanyatwe
Tabudirira
Tombo I
Tombo Ii
Tongogara
Unincorporated Area

Rushinga District

Bopoma
Chipara
Katohwe
Mahomba
Makuni
Maname

Mapani
Marambanzara
Masoso
Masvingo
Mukosa
Nyamanyanya

Nyamuzeya
Rukuta
Rusambo
Zvingowe

Seke District

Chirimanhunga
Eleven
Mandedza
Mapfuti
Marirangwe North

Marirangwe South
Matiti
Mutiusinazita
Nemasanga
Ngome

Twelve
Unincorporated Area
Zhakata

Shamva District

Chidembo
Chihuri
Chizinga (nyamaropa)
Gono
Goora

Kajakata
Mupfure
Mutumba
Nyamaruro
Nyarukunda

Rukoroori (mufurudzi)
Sanye
Shamva Lscfa (umfurudzi N)
Unincorporated Area

Shurugwi District

Unincorporated Area
Ward 1 (Gundura)
Ward 2 (Ndanga)
Ward 3 (Donga)

Ward 4 (Hanke)
Ward 5 (Nhema)
Ward 6 (Tinhira)
Ward 7 (Tongogara)

Ward 8 (Mazivisa)
Ward 9 (Shamba)
Ward 10 (Pisira)

Tsholotsho District

Unincorporated Area
Ward 1
Ward 2
Ward 3
Ward 4
Ward 5
Ward 6

Ward 7
Ward 8
Ward 9
Ward 10
Ward 11
Ward 12
Ward 13

Ward 14
Ward 15
Ward 16
Ward 17
Ward 18
Ward 19
Ward 20

Umguza District

Fingo
Ntabazinduna North

Ntabazinduna South
Ntabazinduna West

Unincorporated Area

Umzingwane District

Habane
Maplotini
Crocodile
Ntabende
Irisvale
Sikhoveni
Dobi
Dula
Esibomvu
Kumbudzi

Nswazi
Mathendele
Mawabeni
Mpisini
Mbizingwe
Shale
Sigola
Sihlengeni
Howmine
Silobi
Malabala

Uzumba-Maramba-Pfungwe
Unincorporated Area

Zvimba District

Chikambi
Chimbamauro
Chivanje
Dununu
Mucheka
Mudapakati

Nyamangara
Unincorporated Area
Ward 4
Ward 7
Ward 8
Ward 9

Ward 10
Ward 14
Ward 19
Ward 32 Madzimure Tafadzwa
Mhondongori

Zvishavane District

Chenhunguru
Chiwonekano
Dayadaya
Guruguru
Hombe
Indava

Lscfa
Mapirimira
Mazvihwa
Mototi
Murowa
Mutambe
Ngomayebani

Runde
Shauke
Shavahuru
Ture
Unincorporated Area
Vukusvo

References

 
Subdivisions of Zimbabwe
Zimbabwe, Wards
Zimbabwe 3
Wards, Zimbabwe
Zimbabwe politics-related lists
Zimbabwe geography-related lists